Streptomyces lincolnensis is a bacterium species in the type genus Streptomyces.

S. lincolnensis produces the antibacterial lincomycin. It also produces valienol, a C-7 cyclitol similar in structure to valienamine.

The name of the species is derived from Lincoln, Nebraska.

See also 
 List of Streptomyces species

References

External links 

Type strain of Streptomyces lincolnensis at BacDive -  the Bacterial Diversity Metadatabase

lincolnensis
Bacteria described in 1963